Solomon and Saturn is the generic name given to four Old English works, which present a dialogue of riddles between Solomon, the king of Israel, and Saturn, identified in two of the poems as a prince of the Chaldeans.

On account of earlier editorial tendencies, the two poetical works, Solomon and Saturn I and Solomon and Saturn II, have often been read as a single, continuous poem. They are considered to be among the most enigmatic and difficult poems in the Old English corpus.

The Prose Solomon and Saturn

The Prose Solomon and Saturn in the Nowell Codex (the Beowulf manuscript) is a question-and-answer text dealing chiefly with issues of biblical or Christian lore. It has many similarities to a later Old English prose dialogue, Adrian and Ritheus and, later still, the Middle English Master of Oxford's Catechism.

Poetic versions

Solomon and Saturn I, Solomon and Saturn II, and the Pater Noster Solomon and Saturn in MS Cambridge, Corpus Christi College (CCCC) 422 are often compared to the Vafþrúðnismál and Alvíssmál and other similar poems in the Old Norse Poetic Edda.

Date

As with most Old English poetry, the Solomon and Saturn poems have proved to be very difficult to date. Patrick O'Neill has argued for a connection to the court of Alfred the Great (reigned 886 – 26 October 899), but Daniel Anlezark sees the poem as fitting into the cultural milieu of Dunstan's Glastonbury in the mid-tenth century.

The Solomon and Saturn texts are often considered the earliest examples of a broader European literary tradition of Solomonic dialogues. These include the comparatively later dialogues of Solomon and Marcolf, which are attested in a number of European languages.

Solomon and Saturn I

Solomon and Saturn I is one of the few Old English poems to survive in more than one manuscript. It appears in MS CCCC 41 and MS CCCC 422. Along with the Pater Noster Solomon and Saturn, Solomon and Saturn I contains runes as a sort of riddling shorthand in which runic characters stand for the words in Old English that name them. From this we know some of the names for the extended set of runes used to write Old English. 

The prose version has as one of its riddles: "Who invented letters? Mercurius the giant." The Anglo-Saxons routinely identified Mercury with Woden (known in Old Norse as Óðinn, and widely today as Odin), who gave his name to Wednesday.

Solomon and Saturn II

Solomon and Saturn II, which is often regarded as having more aesthetic merit, contains a number of riddles, including two of the most obscure passages in Old English literature, the Weallande Wulf and Vasa Mortis riddles.

Weallende Wulf
Saturn's first riddle describes a dragonslayer named Wulf and the wasteland that arises after his death. The poem's earlier editor, Robert Menner, argued that the weallende Wulf passage stems from ancient Hebrew legends regarding Nimrod and the builders of the Tower of Babel. He interprets Wulf as the Babylonian god Bel, who is connected with Saturn in Isidore's Etymologies. Andy Orchard has found similarities between Wulf and Beowulf. Daniel Anlezark has argued that the passage participates in an "Avernian tradition" that describes impassable wastelands of ancient history. Tristan Major has suggested that the passage is a conflation of biblical and classic material, and that Wulf is to be identified with the mythological Perseus.

Vasa Mortis
The riddle describes a mysterious bird that has been bound by Solomon ntil Doomsday and is feared by the leaders of the Philistines. The final line of the passage names the bird as Vasa Mortis. Robert Menner has argued that ancient Jewish legends of Solomon's struggles with demons are at the heart of the riddle, and he identifies the Vasa Mortis with the demon Asmodeus. Cilluffo sees parallels between the Vasa Mortis and the description of Fame in Virgil's Aeneid, as well as the nocturnal monster in the Anglo-Saxon Liber Monstrorum and the griffin in the Wonders of the East.

Themes

Kathryn Powell has described these poetic versions as examples of "orientalist fantasy", which works to suppress anxieties about English cultural identity. She argues that they attempt to minimise anxieties about the unstable condition of knowledge, and about the future of the Anglo=Saxon kingdoms and the Christian faith, by "displacing any lack of knowledge, political stability or faith onto the Eastern and pagan figure of Saturn and the Chaldean people he represents". Powell suggests that the dialogues' original readers were encouraged to identify with the figure of Solomon, who is constructed as a model of Christian ideals and behaviour.

References

Bibliography

Editions

Anlezark, Daniel, The Old English Dialogues of Solomon and Saturn, Anglo-Saxon Texts 7, Cambridge, 2009
Cross, James E., and Hill, Thomas D., The 'Prose Solomon and Saturn' and 'Adrian and Ritheus''', Toronto, 1982
Dobbie, Elliott van Kirk, Anglo-Saxon Minor Poems, Anglo-Saxon Poetic Records 6, New York, 1942
Foys, Martin et al., Old English Poetry in Facsimile Project, Madison, 2019
Kemble, John M., The Dialogue of Salomon and Saturnus, London, 1848
Menner, R.J., The Poetical Dialogues of Solomon and Saturn, MLA Monograph Series 13, New York, 1941

Scholarship
Anlezark, Daniel, "Poisoned Places: The Avernian Tradition in Old English Poetry." Anglo-Saxon England 36 (2007) 103–126
Cilluffo, Gilda, "Mirabilia ags.: il Vasa Mortis nel Salomone e Saturno." Annali Istituto Universitario Orientale di Napoli Filologia germanica 24 (1981): 211–226
Dane, Joseph A., "The Structure of the Old English 'Solomon and Saturn II'." Neophilologus 64.4 (1980) 592–603
Major, Tristan, "Saturn’s First Riddle in Solomon and Saturn II: An Orientalist Conflation." Neophilologus 96 (2012) 301-313
Menner, R.J., "The Vasa Mortis Passage in the Old English 'Salomon and Saturn'." Studies in English Philology in Honor of F. Klaeber. Minneapolis, 1929.
Menner, R.J., "Nimrod and the Wolf in the Old English Solomon and Saturn." JEGP 37 (1938) 332–54
Nelson, Marie, "King Solomon's Magic: The Power of a Written Text." Oral Tradition 5 (1990) 20–36
O'Brien O'Keeffe, Katherine, Visible Song: Transitional Literacy in Old English Verse. Cambridge Studies in Anglo-Saxon England 4. Cambridge: Cambridge University Press, 1990
O'Brien O'Keeffe, Katherine, "The Geographic List of Solomon and Saturn II." Anglo-Saxon England 20 (1991) 123–42
O'Neill, Patrick, "On the Date, Provenance and Relationship of the ‘Solomon and Saturn’ Dialogues." Anglo-Saxon England 26 (1997: 139-168
Orchard, Andy, Pride and Prodigies: Studies in the Monsters of the Beowulf Manuscript. Cambridge: D.S. Brewer, 1994
Paz, James, "Magic That Works: Performing Scientia in the Old English Metrical Charms and Poetic Dialogues of Solomon and Saturn." JMEMS 45.2 (2015) 219–43
Powell, Kathryn, "Orientalist Fantasy in the Poetic Dialogues of Solomon and Saturn." Anglo-Saxon England 34 (2005) 117–143
Shippey, T.A., Poems of Wisdom and Learning in Old English. Cambridge: D.S. Brewer, 1976
Vincenti, A.R. von, Die altenglischen Dialogue von Salomon und Saturn mit historische Einleitung, Kommentar und Glossar. Leipzig: Deichert, 1904

External link
Solomon and Saturn I and Solomon and Saturn II (Old English)

9th-century poems
10th-century poems
Anglo-Saxon paganism
Anglo-Saxon runes
Old English poems
Riddles
Saturn (mythology)
Solomon
Chaldea
Orientalism
Alfred the Great
Glastonbury